The 2008 United States presidential election in Georgia took place on November 4, 2008. Voters chose 15 representatives, or electors to the Electoral College, who voted for president and vice president.

Georgia was won by Republican nominee John McCain with a 5.2% margin of victory. Prior to the election, 15 of 17 news organizations considered this a state McCain would win, or otherwise a red state. It is situated in the Deep South, entrenched in the Bible Belt (the city of Atlanta being an exception). By 2008 it was considered a Republican stronghold, not having been won by a Democratic presidential candidate since 1992, and having given double-digit victories to George W. Bush in 2000 and 2004. McCain was able to keep Georgia in the GOP column in 2008 despite the large African American turnout that kept his margin of victory within single digits. 

With its 15 electoral votes, Georgia was the second-largest prize for McCain in 2008, behind only Texas. This was also the last time Georgia voted more Republican than Missouri, Montana, or Indiana. , this is the last election in which Chattahoochee County voted Democratic.

Primaries
Georgia Democratic primary, 2008
Georgia Republican primary, 2008

Campaign
An ambitious Barack Obama targeted Georgia as potential state he could flip from red to blue, albeit as a relatively long-shot target. Democrats hoped libertarian candidate Bob Barr – whose home state was Georgia – might take away votes for John McCain and play the role of a spoiler. In the early months, Obama bought ads and even appeared in person to campaign in the state.

However, polling consistently showed McCain with a double-digit lead. Over the summer, Obama's campaign stumbled, and the Illinois senator even fell behind McCain for a short while in September. In light of these difficulties, the Democratic campaign started shifting resources to North Carolina, which they regarded as more competitive. Obama stopped advertising in the state and moved away staff, although he retained a large volunteer force. As the campaign neared the end, Obama jumped to a national lead, helped by the September financial crisis, but remained behind in Georgia polling.

Predictions
There were 16 news organizations who made state-by-state predictions of the election. Here are their last predictions before election day:

Polling

McCain won almost every pre-election poll. The final 3 poll average gave the Republican the lead with 50% to 47%.

Fundraising
McCain raised $4,835,902. Obama raised $8,568,716.

Advertising and visits
Obama spent over $4,105,888. McCain and his interest groups spent just $49,507. Both McCain and Obama visited Atlanta once.

Analysis
In terms of the margin, McCain won a quite narrow victory, capturing 52.23% of the popular vote to Democrat Barack Obama's 47.02% popular vote. This margin was significantly lower than that in 2004 when George W. Bush carried this state by a 17% margin, winning 58% of the popular vote to John Kerry's 41%. Obama won huge victories in the two most populous counties, DeKalb County and Fulton County which contains the state capital and largest city of Atlanta, which contributed to his popular vote percentage.  He also made significant inroads in Atlanta's normally heavily Republican suburbs.  For instance, Obama lost Cobb County by nine points compared to Kerry's 25-point loss.  Obama lost Gwinnett County by 11 points compared to a 33-point loss for Kerry.  Aside from native son Jimmy Carter sweeping every county in the state in 1976, a Democrat hadn't won either county since 1960, and would not do so until Hillary Clinton in 2016.  However, McCain piled up the votes in the more rural northern and southeastern parts of the state (well over 70% in some cases) which gave him the edge and ultimate win.  These two areas were among the first regions of Georgia to turn Republican; the old-line Southern Democrats in these areas began splitting their tickets as early as the 1950s, and some areas of north Georgia are among the few ancestrally Republican areas of the South.

The large African American turnout was widely attributed to the narrow margin by which McCain carried the state. However, Obama was unable to improve his percentage amongst white voters. According to exit polls, 77% of white voters supported the Republican candidate - the same as in 2004. This effectively eliminated Obama's chances of winning the state.

Of the several independent and third-party candidates who ran for president in 2008, two were from Georgia: former Republican Representative Bob Barr running on the Libertarian Party (who placed third overall in the popular vote in Georgia), and former Democratic Representative Cynthia McKinney running on the Green Party.

During the same election, incumbent Republican U.S. Senator Saxby Chambliss was held below 50% of the popular vote in a contentious U.S. Senate race against Democrat Jim Martin and Libertarian Allen Buckley. Abiding by Georgia law, this led to a runoff election in December between Chambliss and Martin. Chambliss brought in 2008 vice presidential nominee Governor Sarah Palin of Alaska to campaign for him and rally the base of the GOP. Former President Bill Clinton campaigned on behalf of Martin. Turnout was lower than in the general election and African Americans didn't turn out as large as they did in November for Obama, all factors that led up to Chambliss's victory. The incumbent was reelected with 57.44% of the vote while Martin received 42.56%.

During the 2008 U.S. House elections, incumbent Democratic Representatives Jim Marshall (GA-8) and John Barrow (GA-12), each of whom was narrowly re-elected by 1% or less in 2006 despite the pro-Democratic political environment that year, were both re-elected by unexpectedly wide margins despite efforts by Republicans to win both of the districts. At the state level, during the same election, Republicans picked up four seats in the Georgia House of Representatives.

Results

(*Peroutka was not the Constitution Party's nominee in 2008.)

By county

Counties that flipped from Democratic to Republican
 Webster (largest town: Preston)

Counties that flipped from Republican to Democratic
 Baldwin (largest town: Milledgeville)
 Burke (largest town: Waynesboro)
 Chattahoochee (largest town: Cusseta)
 Douglas (largest town: Douglasville)
 Newton (largest town: Covington)
 Peach (largest town: Fort Valley)
 Rockdale (largest town: Conyers)
 Sumter (largest town: Americus)
 Washington (largest town: Sandersville)

By congressional district
John McCain carried 8 of 13 districts in Georgia, including one district held by a Democrat.

Electors

Technically the voters of Georgia cast their ballots for electors: representatives to the Electoral College. Georgia is allocated 15 electors because it has 13 congressional districts and 2 senators. All candidates who appear on the ballot or qualify to receive write-in votes must submit a list of 15 electors, who pledge to vote for their candidate and his or her running mate. Whoever wins the majority of votes in the state is awarded all 15 electoral votes. Their chosen electors then vote for president and vice president. Although electors are pledged to their candidate and running mate, they are not obligated to vote for them. An elector who votes for someone other than his or her candidate is known as a faithless elector.

The electors of each state and the District of Columbia met on December 15, 2008, to cast their votes for president and vice president. The Electoral College itself never meets as one body. Instead the electors from each state and the District of Columbia met in their respective capitols.

The following were the members of the Electoral College from the state. All 15 were pledged to John McCain and Sarah Palin:
 Esther Clark
 Dennis Coxwell
 Norma Edenfield
 Randy Evans
 Sue P. Everhart
 Leigh Ann Gillis
 Judy Goddard
 Linda Herren
 Rufus Montgomery
 Clint Murphy
 Sunny Park
 Alec Poitevint
 John Sours
 Allan Vigil
 John White

References

Georgia
2008 Georgia (U.S. state) elections
2008